Vinogradovca is a commune in Taraclia District, Moldova. It is composed of four villages: Chirilovca, Ciumai, Mirnoe and Vinogradovca.

References

Communes of Taraclia District